Ana Paula Vergutz (born 20 April 1989) is a Brazilian canoeist. She competed in the women's K-1 200 metres event at the 2016 Summer Olympics.

References

External links
 

1989 births
Living people
Brazilian female canoeists
Olympic canoeists of Brazil
Canoeists at the 2016 Summer Olympics
Place of birth missing (living people)
Pan American Games medalists in canoeing
Pan American Games bronze medalists for Brazil
Canoeists at the 2015 Pan American Games
Medalists at the 2015 Pan American Games
21st-century Brazilian women